Troy Matthew Batchelor (born 29 August 1987) is an Australian speedway rider.

Career

Australia
Born in Brisbane, Queensland, Troy Batchelor enjoyed his first success when he won the 2001 Queensland and New South Wales Under-16 championships and followed this up by winning the 2003 Australian Under-16 Championship at the Bibra Lake Speedway in Perth. After graduating to the senior ranks following his 16th birthday, Batchelor won the Queensland State Championship in 2007 before he moved to Adelaide in South Australia where he has won the South Australian Championship at the Gillman Speedway five times (2008-2011, 2013). He currently sits all time second on the SA title winners list behind joint record holders John Boulger and the 1951 and 1952 World Champion Jack Young. Boulger and Young each won nine SA titles during their respective careers.

In January 2008, he finished runner-up to Chris Holder in the Australian Solo Championship.

In January 2013, he won the Australian Championship after having finished second in both 2008 and 2010.

Batchelor also won the Australian Long Track Championship in 2003 at the Bathurst Showground, and again in 2004 at the Wagga Wagga Showground.

On 3 December 2016, Batchelor added the Victorian Championship to his impressive resume when he won the championship at Undera Park, defeating reigning U/21 World Champion Max Fricke, Jordan Stewart and Ty Proctor in the Final.

UK and Europe
Batchelor began his British speedway career in 2005 when he signed for King's Lynn Stars in the Premier League. In his first year, he won the Premier League Knockout Cup and the Premier Trophy, with King's Lynn defeating Rye House Rockets in both finals. The next season Batchelor was back at King's Lynn and was also Elite League team Coventry Bees number 8 rider. That year King's Lynn won a treble of the Premier League Championship, Premier Trophy and the Premier League Knockout Cup. He also helped Coventry win the Elite League Knockout Cup.

In 2007, Batchelor stepped up to the Elite League full-time with the Poole Pirates, whom he signed for on loan from King's Lynn. He also signed for Polish team Unia Leszno in the Ekstraliga and helped them win the 2007 Ekstraliga Championship. In 2008, Batchelor was on loan at Swindon Robins and continued with Unia Leszno in Poland. He also signed for Dackarna in the Swedish Elitserien.

In 2022, he joined Ipswich Witches from Sheffield Tigers for SGB Premiership 2022 season and won the Premiership Pairs. He also joined the Oxford Cheetahs for the SGB Championship 2022 season, with the Cheetahs were returning to action after a 14-year absence from British Speedway.

International
Batchelor made his Speedway Grand Prix debut in the Grand Prix of Poland II at the MotoArena Toruń in Toruń, Poland in 2013. Riding as a substitute in the meeting, he finished in 12th place scoring 6 points.

For the 2014 Speedway Grand Prix, Batchelor became one of the top 15 Qualified Riders of the series. In his first full-time run at the World Championship, he finished in 9th place with 91 points scored. Batchelor scored his first podium when he finished second in the Danish Grand Prix at the Parken Stadium in Copenhagen.

Troy Batchelor has also represented Australia in the Speedway World Cup and numerous test matches.

World Final appearances

World Cup
 2009 -  Leszno, Alfred Smoczyk Stadium - 2nd - 43pts (4)
 2011 -  Gorzów Wielkopolski, Edward Jancarz Stadium - 2nd - 45pts (10)
 2013 -  Prague, Marketa Stadium - 3rd - 33pts (11)
 2014 -  Bydgoszcz, Polonia Bydgoszcz Stadium - 3rd - 36pts (2)
 2015 -  Vojens, Speedway Center - 4th - 26pts (8)

Individual Under-21 World Championship
 2006 -  Terenzano, Olympia Speedway Stadium - 17th - 2pts (Reserve)
 2008 -  Pardubice, Svítkov Stadion - 4th - 11pts

Under-21 World Cup
 2008 -  Holsted - 4th - 33pts (7)

World Longtrack Championship
 2004 (1 app) - 22nd - 5pts

Speedway Grand Prix results

References

1987 births
Living people
Australian speedway riders
Ipswich Witches riders
King's Lynn Stars riders
Oxford Cheetahs riders
Poole Pirates riders
Sheffield Tigers riders
Swindon Robins riders
Peterborough Panthers riders
Individual Speedway Long Track World Championship riders
Racing drivers from Brisbane